The  is an electric multiple unit (EMU) train type operated by East Japan Railway Company (JR East) in Japan. It was introduced by JR East on 9 July 2005 to replace the aging 403 and 415 series EMUs running on the Jōban Line from Ueno Station in Tokyo.

Operations
 Tōkaidō Main Line (–)
 Ueno–Tokyo Line
 Jōban Line (–)
 Mito Line
 Tōhoku Main Line (–)

Formations

10-car sets
As of 1 October 2018, 26 ten-car sets (K401–K426) are based at Katsuta Depot and formed with four motored ("M") cars and six non-powered trailer ("T") cars.

 Cars 3 and 8 each have one single-arm pantograph.
 Cars 1 and 10 have a wheelchair space.
 Cars 1, 5, and 10 each have a toilet (universal design in cars 1 and 10).
 Car 8 is designated as a mildly air-conditioned car.
 Cars 4 and 5 are bilevel Green Cars.
 Car 9 in sets K412–K422 are numbered in the -2000 series and have longitudinal seating (these cars were originally cars 4 and 5 in sets K401–K406); in all other sets, they are numbered in the -0 series and have some transverse seating bays.
 Cars 1, 2, and 10 have some transverse seating bays.

Standard 5-car sets
As of 3 March 2020, 33 five-car sets (K451–K483) are based at Katsuta Depot and formed with two motored ("M") cars and three non-powered trailer ("T") cars.

 Car 13 has one single-arm pantograph.
 Cars 11 and 15 have a wheelchair space.
 Car 11 has a universal design toilet.
 Car 14 is designated as a mildly air-conditioned car.
 Cars 13, 14, and 15 have some transverse seating bays.

Cold-weather 5-car sets
As of 1 October 2018, seven five-car sets (K551–K557) are based at Katsuta Depot and formed with two motored ("M") cars and three non-powered trailer ("T") cars.

 Car 13 has one single-arm pantograph.
 Cars 11 and 15 have a wheelchair space.
 Car 11 has a universal design toilet.
 Car 14 is designated as a mildly air-conditioned car.
 Cars 13, 14, and 15 have some transverse seating bays.

Original 10-car sets (July 2005 – March 2007)
The original ten-car sets delivered without bilevel Green cars were formed as follows.

Sets K401–K406

Sets K407–K411

 Cars 3 and 8 each had one single-arm pantograph.
 Cars 1 and 10 had a wheelchair space.
 Cars 1, 5, and 10 each had a toilet (universal design in cars 1 and 10).
 Car 8 was designated as a mildly air-conditioned car.
 Cars 1, 2, 9, and 10 had some transverse seating bays.

Interior

History
The first E531 series trains entered service on 9 July 2005.

Pairs of double-deck "Green" (first class) cars were added to the ten-car sets from 6 January 2007, and all ten-car sets included Green cars by the start of the revised timetable on 18 March 2007. Two trailer cars from sets K401–K411 (cars 4 and 5) were repurposed as cars 6 and 9 in sets K412–K422. As there were 12 SaHa E531-2000 cars and 10 SaHa E530-2000 cars being repurposed (the latter type has an air compressor missing from the former type), the SaHa E531-2012 car was modified to become SaHa E530-2022.

In September 2014, an additional ten-car set, K423, was delivered from the J-TREC factory in Yokohama, four years after construction of the original fleet had ceased. This was followed by seven new five-car sets (K469–K475) also delivered from J-TREC in Yokohama from December 2014 to March 2015. Seven cold-weather E531-3000 series sets (K551–K557) were built between October 2015 and March 2017. Later in 2017, three more 10-car sets (K424–K426) and two more five-car sets (K476 and K477) were built. Then, between 2019 and 2020, six more five-car sets (K478–K483) were built.

It collided with a passenger vehicle which caught fire and caused damage to the KuHa E531-17 car (car 10).

Special liveries

To celebrate the 60th anniversary of the Katsuta Depot, set K451 entered service on 5 November 2021 in a wrapping reminiscent of the livery of the 401 series trains.

References

Further reading

External links

 JR E531 series 
 JR East press release announcing new trains in December 2003 

Electric multiple units of Japan
East Japan Railway Company
Jōban Line
Train-related introductions in 2005
J-TREC multiple units
Kawasaki multiple units
Tokyu Car multiple units
1500 V DC multiple units of Japan
20 kV AC multiple units